Sergei Vladimirovich Bodrov (born June 28, 1948) is a Russian film director, screenwriter, and producer. In 2003 he was the President of the Jury at the 25th Moscow International Film Festival.

Life and career
Bodrov was born in Khabarovsk, Russian SFSR, Soviet Union (now Russia). In the post-Soviet period he emigrated to the United States. His son, actor Sergei Bodrov, Jr. was killed in an avalanche in the mountains of the North Caucasus on September 20, 2002, while shooting a film titled The Messenger.

Bodrov's paternal grandmother was an ethnic Buryat, which influenced his decision to make the movie Mongol.

Bodrov currently has an apartment in Los Angeles and a ranch in Arizona. He is married to American film consultant Carolyn Cavallaro.

Awards
Prisoner of the Mountains
Nika Award for Best Picture and Best Director.
Academy Award for Best Foreign Language Film nomination.
Mongol
Nika Award for Best Picture and Best Director.
Academy Award for Best Foreign Language Film nomination.
The Quickie
23rd Moscow International Film Festival Golden St. George (nominated)

Filmography
Freedom Is Paradise (1989)
Katala (1989)
White King, Red Queen (1992)
Prisoner of the Mountains (1996)
Running Free (2000)
The Quickie (2001)
Bear's Kiss (2002)
Shiza (2004)
Nomad (2005)
Mongol ( 2007)
 A Yakuza's Daughter Never Cries (2010)
Seventh Son (2014)
Breathe Easy (2022)

References

External links

 Culturebase 

1948 births
Living people
Academicians of the Russian Academy of Cinema Arts and Sciences "Nika"
American people of Buryat descent
American people of Mongolian descent
European Film Award for Best Screenwriter winners
People from Khabarovsk
Russian film directors
Russian people of Buryat descent
Russian people of Mongolian descent
Soviet film directors